Timeidae is a family of sponges belonging to the order Tethyida.

Genera:
 Timea Gray, 1867

References

Sponge families